Union (Al-Ittihad) is a rapid transit station on the Green and Red Lines of the Dubai Metro in Dubai. It is one of two transfer stations between lines, the other being BurJuman. Since it began service, over 16.224 million passengers have used Union station, making it the busiest station on the network.

History
Union station opened on 9 September 2009 (09-09-09) as part of the initial stretch of the Dubai Metro, with Red Line trains running from Rashidiya to Nakheel Harbour and Tower. Union was one of seven intermediate stations to begin service, with additional stations on the Red Line added intermittently over the next year. Exactly two years later, the Green Line began service. The area around the station is known for its extraordinary amount of stray cats.

Location
Located in Deira, Union station lies below Union Square. It is one of the closest metro stations to the central portion of Dubai Creek. As a result of its central location, nearby attractions and points of interest include numerous consulates, Dubai municipal government buildings, Al Ghurair City Mall and Maktoum Hospital. It is also close to Al Ghurair Centre, Dubai Creek, Twin Towers, and Union Square Bus Station (with buses to Ajman, Fujairah, and Sharjah).

Station layout
As one of two interchange points between the Green and Red Lines, Union station is one of the most complex stations of the Dubai Metro. Spanning , it is the largest underground station in the world. Both lines utilise a side platform setup with two tracks each; the Green Line tracks approach the station from the west below Al Maktoum Road and turn northwards underneath Omar Bin Al Khattab Road, while the Red Line crosses Dubai Creek and travels below Omar Bin Al Khattab Road before turning sharply eastward underneath Al Rigga Road.

Gallery

Platform layout

References

External links
 

Railway stations in the United Arab Emirates opened in 2009
Dubai Metro stations